Founded in 2004, Keystone Accountability is a not-for-profit organization with locations in United Kingdom, South Africa, United States. Keystone's mission strives to improve the effectiveness of social purpose organizations. Using benchmarking surveys, feedback and analysis, Keystone consults on NGOs, international development agencies, and major foundations to plan, measure and report social change.  In 2009, Keystone blended participatory evaluation and customer satisfaction to create a new methodology referred to as Constituent Voice.

Past Projects
 Global Knowledge Partnership Evaluation (2007) 
 The Rural Enterprise Development Initiative. (2007) 
 East African Grantee Survey (2008) 
 Grantmaker Performance Survey (2008) 
 Networks Survey (2009) 
 International NGO Survey (2010–2011) 
 Social Investment Performance (2010) 
 Southern Africa Grantee Survey (2010–2011)

See also

 Philanthropy
 Social enterprise
 Social change
 Consultant
 NGO
 Socially responsible investing

References 

International development agencies
Organizations established in 2004